The rock'n'roll competition in dancesport at the 2005 World Games took place from 16 to 17 July 2005 at the König Pilsener Arena in Oberhausen, Germany.

Competition format
A total of 20 pairs entered the competition. Best twelve pairs from round one qualifies to the semifinal. From semifinal the best seven pairs qualifies to the final.

Results

References

External links
 Results on IWGA website

Dancesport at the 2005 World Games